FYP may refer to: 
 F.Y.P, an American punk band
 Five-year plan (disambiguation)
 Foundation Year Program
 Final year project
 the "For you page" on TikTok, which allows users to view a feed of recommended videos